St. Francis Medical Center is a hospital within the City of Trenton, New Jersey located on Hamilton Avenue and was owned by Trinity Health.

History
St. Francis Hospital was founded in 1874 by the Sisters of St. Francis of Philadelphia. 
The hospital was introduced a plaque in honor of President John F. Kennedy in 1968. Today, the plaque is placed at the corner of Hamilton Ave. and Chambers St. The building consists of a parking lot, emergency entrance (which has an entrance for only ambulances), and a main building.

Capital Health entered an agreement to purchase St. Francis Medical Center in 2022 and assumed operational control starting at midnight on 12/21/22. It was renamed Capital Health- East Trenton.

The hospital was the birthplace of United States Supreme Court Justice Antonin Scalia.

References

External links
 

Hospitals in New Jersey
Trenton, New Jersey